

Mersin Feneri (The Mersin Lighthouse) is located at the Mediterranean coast in the city of Mersin, Turkey.

Geography 
Mersin lighthouse is within the Mersin urban fabric and is situated at the west of the mouth of Efrenk River. İsmet İnönü Boulevard is to the north of the lighthouse. It is surrounded by walking tracks  and on the west there is a group of restaurants. Since the dominant wind in Mersin area is lodos (from south west) the lighthouse provides service to the vessels approaching from the west as it is usually the case.

History 
The lighthouse was built in 1865, and reconstructed in 1955. It was bought by the Republic of Turkey, and now it is operated by Directorate General of Coastal Safety.

Technical details 
The building is an octagonal cylindrical masonry tower with lantern and gallery. Adjacent to the tower, there is a keeper's house. It flashes three times white every ten seconds. In the past the light source was kerosene and acetylene. Currently, it is lit by a halogen lamp. Mersin lighthouse is listed in Turkey under the code "TUR-043".

See also

 List of lighthouses in Turkey

References

External links
 Directorate General of Coastal Safety

Lighthouses completed in 1865
Lighthouses in Turkey
Buildings and structures in Mersin